Giambastiani is an Italian surname. Notable people with the surname include:

Edmund Giambastiani (born 1948), United States Navy admiral
Kurt R. A. Giambastiani (born 1958), American writer

Italian-language surnames
Patronymic surnames